Klochko is a gender-neutral Ukrainian surname. Notable people with the surname include:

Andriy Klochko (born 1981), Ukrainian politician
Lyubov Klochko (born 1959), Ukrainian long-distance runner

See also
 

Ukrainian-language surnames